Casada Aaron Sorrell, known professionally as Sada Baby, is an American rapper and singer. He initially gained recognition in 2018 when the music video for his song "Bloxk Party" went viral, leading to him signing to Asylum Records. A prominent figure of the emerging Detroit rap scene of the mid-to-late 2010s, Sada Baby has become one of the most prolific rappers of the generation. His debut studio album Skuba Sada 2 (2020), a sequel to his 2017 debut mixtape Skuba Sada, peaked at number 125 on the US Billboard 200. In 2020, his song "Whole Lotta Choppas" went viral on TikTok, later receiving a remix featuring Nicki Minaj and peaking at number 35 on the Billboard Hot 100.

Early life 
Casada Sorrell was born and raised in the Regent Park neighborhood on the east side of Detroit, Michigan. According to him, he sang in the church choir from the age of nine to eleven, but then moved to Washington, D.C. for a year. He grew up with dreams of playing basketball, and took interest in music after his cousin Ashley started singing.

Career

2013–2017: Career beginnings  
In 2013, Sada Baby began taking rapping seriously and cultivated a following. He released numerous songs and was featured on a number of tracks in the next three years, but received little attention. He nearly quit in 2016 until entering and winning a local rap competition, beating out 12 other rappers and earning money. Sada began releasing a series of singles and music on YouTube, culminating in the release of his breakout debut mixtape, Skuba Sada, in 2017. That same year, he also signed to his friend Tee Grizzley's record label Grizzley Gang, and released another mixtape called D.O.N - Dat One Nigga.

2018–2019: Breakthrough, "Bloxk Party" and mixtapes 
In March 2018, Sada Baby released the video for his song "Bloxk Party", a collaboration with fellow Detroit rapper Drego. A few months after his breakthrough, Sada Baby signed to Asylum Records. "Bloxk Party" was released again on September 28, 2018, as the second single for his third mixtape Bartier Bounty, which Baby would release on January 25, 2019, under Asylum. The mixtape also contains his 2018 singles "Cheat Code, "Pimp Named Drip Dat" and "Driple Double", and met with positive reviews from music critics. On August 16, 2019, Sada released his song "Next Up" featuring Tee Grizzley. On September 27, 2019, he released his fourth mixtape Whoop Tape via SoundCloud and DatPiff. On November 1, 2019, he released a single titled "2K20". Sada Baby eventually left Grizzley Gang, due to being restricted from releasing music at the prolific rate he was accustomed to, in 2019.

2020–present: "Whole Lotta Choppas" 
On January 1, 2020, he released his mixtape Brolik, a DatPiff exclusive and a collection of singles he released in the last six months. On January 10, 2020, he released his song "Pressin", featuring rapper King Von. In March 2020, Sada released his debut studio album, Skuba Sada 2, which contains his 2020 single "Aktivated". The deluxe edition features the singles "2K20" and "Pressin". The album received generally positive reviews, and charted at number 125 on Billboard 200. On July 17, 2020, he announced his mixtape Bartier Bounty 2, and released it a week later. On August 14, 2020, Sada Baby released the single "Whole Lotta Choppas", which sparked a viral dance challenge on TikTok and debuted at number 92 on the Billboard Hot 100. On October 16, 2020, a remix of the song featuring Nicki Minaj was released. The song later peaked at number 35.

Discography

Studio albums

Mixtapes

Singles

Guest appearances

Notes

References

External links

 Official website

1992 births
Living people
Rappers from Detroit
Singers from Detroit
Rappers from Michigan
Asylum Records artists
African-American male rappers
21st-century African-American male singers
21st-century American rappers
21st-century American singers
People from Detroit
People from Michigan
American hip hop singers
Midwest hip hop musicians
Trap musicians
21st-century American male singers